Formula Renault are classes of formula racing popular in Europe and elsewhere. Regarded as an entry-level series to motor racing, it was founded in 1971, and was a respected series where drivers can learn advanced racecraft before moving on to higher formulas.

Renault now backs the French F4 Championship and Formula Regional European Championship. The World Series by Renault once included Formula Renault 3.5 before becoming World Series Formula V8 3.5 in 2016, then folding in 2017.

Formula Renault 3.5L
The most senior "Formula Renault" was the Formula Renault V6 Eurocup started by Renault to run as part of Eurosport's Super Racing Weekends (ETCC and FIA GT Championship). Only two seasons were run between 2003 and 2004 before Renault left Super Racing Weekends and merged the series with the similar World Series by Nissan to create the Formula Renault 3.5 Series as part of the World Series by Renault in 2005. In 2016 the series became the World Series Formula V8 3.5, which folded in 2017.

Formula V6 Asia started in 2006 in Asia and ran at Asian Festival of Speed Weekends (Touring Car, Formula BMW and Porsche Carrera Cup Asia).

The old Eurocup and current Asian formulas use Tatuus chassis, while the World Series uses Dallara cars. Michelin is the tyre supplier.

The cars
 Engine: Renault Type V4Y RS, 60° V6, 3498 cc, 425-500 hp - since 2012 Zytek ZRS03 V8, 3396 cc, 530 hp
 Chassis: Tatuus (Eurocup and Asia) or Dallara T02/T05/T08/T12 (World Series) Carbon-fibre Monocoque, carbon and fibreglass bodywork
 Width: 1850 mm (72.8") maximum
 Wheelbase: 3000–3125 mm
 Track: 1579 mm (front) and 1536 mm (rear)
 Weight: 616 kg
 Fuel: 110 litres
 Suspension front and rear with torsion bar, push-rod, twin struts
 Telemetry, and steering wheel
 Sequential gearbox, six gears
 Wheels: Single piece magnesium with central nut, 10 x 13 (front) and 13 x 13 (rear)
 Tyres: Michelin dry and rain, 24 x 57 x 13 (front) and 31 x 60 x 13 (rear)

Championships

A Pan Am Formula Renault V6 series was planned to take place in 2005 but it never occurred.

Formula Renault 2.0
Formula Renault 2.0 descended from Formula France created in 1968. Its predecessors used 1.3L (1968–1971), 1.6L (1972–1981), 1.6L turbo (1982–1988) and later 1,721 cc (1989–1994), then 2l 8V (1995–1999) engines in single-seater chassis. The series evolved in 2000 into a 2L 16V series using one-make cars from Italian manufacturer Tatuus. The series was introduced into the UK in 1989 and even after the 1721 cc cars had been replaced at the top level a club-level series for them continued in parallel with the more ambitious 2.0 series. This is seen as one of the key steps in a driver's career before Formula Three.

The most notable recent graduate of the formula is Kimi Räikkönen, who moved straight into Formula One after winning the British Formula Renault championship.

The cars

1995–1999

The Formula Renault 95 used multiple chassis, production 2.0-litre 8V 165 hp engines and Hewland five-speed manual gearboxes. Manufacturers were able to build cars around spec components such as the engine, bellhousing, gearbox, brakes, wheels and ECU. Chassis were steel space frame with fibreglass bodies. Manufacturers included Mygale, Martini, Swift, Tatuus, and Ermolli. The car was last used in 1999.

2000–2009
The Formula Renault 2000 had a Tatuus-made chassis running 2.0 L Renault Clio engines attached to a Sadev gearbox. The engine originally had a maximum output of 185 hp, and was upgraded to 210 hp in 2006. They are capable of accelerating from 0 to 100 mph (160 km/h) in 4.85 seconds and braking from 125 mph (200 km/h) to a stop in 4.60 seconds. The Tatuus Formula Renault car is the most successful single seater ever, with 10 years of service and nearly 1000 sold. The car has produced many current Formula One stars, with 11 of the 25 drivers in the 2009 Formula One season using the car in the infancy of their careers.

For the 2010 season, a new car developed by Barazi-Epsilon, will be used in most major championships, with the old car still being used in minor championships such as Formula Renault BARC in the UK.

Dimensions and weight 

Wheel Base: 2,645 mm
Front Track: 1,434 mm
Rear Track: 1,318 mm
Minimum Weight: 490 kg without driver / 565 kg with driver

Chassis 
The chassis is a carbon fiber cell designed and developed by Tatuus and Renault Sport. It also incorporates a FIA-approved roll hoop and lateral driver's head protection. This was introduced in 2000 and updated with new bodywork in 2004 and 2007. Both the chassis and engine are of an FIA-approved "impact break-away" design.

Cockpit 

 XAP Multi-Changeable Dashboard Display
 FIA-approved Safety Features
 Roll Hoop and Lateral Driver's Head Protective Padding
 Deformable, double-jointed steering column
 Removable steering wheel
 Six-point, 3-inch driver's shoulder and lap harnesses
 FT3 fuel cell
 Manually operated 5 kg fire extinguisher

Engine 
The engine is a sealed, 16-valve, 4-cylinder Renault Sport type F4R FRS with Orbisoud race exhaust system and catalytic converter, built and developed by Renault Sport.
Capacity: 1998 cc
Max Output:  at 6,500 rpm
Max Torque: 22mkg (159lb.ft) at 5,500 rpm
Lubrication: Dry Sump, Elf Evolution LDX 5w/40
Spark Plugs: NGK PFR6E10
ECU: Sealed Magneti-Marelli MF4L ignition system

Gearbox 
Formula Renault uses a Sadev 6-speed, sequential gearbox with mechanical control featuring three specified sets of ratios using a Limited Slip Differential and Twin-Plate. The clutch is hydraulic. It also uses Elf Transmission LS.

Suspension 

Front: Pushrod, controlled single damper with adjustable bump and rebound
Rear: Pushrod, controlled twin dampers with adjustable bump and rebound

Brake 
The brakes are four-pot calipers, with ventilated discs and Ferodo(type DS4003) pads. They include cockpit-adjustable bias front-to-rear.

Tyres 

Front: 16/53 x 
Rear: 23/57 x 
Manufacturer: Michelin control
Exceptions
Asia: Kumho (since 2002)
Brazil: Pirelli (2002–2006)
North America: Yokohama (since 2004)

Wheels 

Front: 8 inches x 
Rear: 10 inches x 
Manufacturer: OZ

2010–today 
Manufactured by Barazi-Epsilon EB01 A

Main changes to the previous models are:

Engine: 2.0L Renault F4R 832 - maximal output has been raised to 
Gearbox is now 7-speed sequential

Championships
Two sorts of Formula Renault 2.0 championships exist. Regular championships and Winter Series, an off-season championship held usually between November and February with few races. In 2005, all series names were replaced from Formula Renault 2000 to Formula Renault 2.0.

An Uruguyan 2.0L series is also held (José Pedro Passadores 2003 champion).

Winners

A majority of Formula Renault champions have gone onto lead successful careers in motor racing, most notably Alain Prost who won the Formula One World Championship four times in his career. Other drivers include René Arnoux, Didier Pironi, Kimi Räikkönen, Felipe Massa and Lewis Hamilton all of whom have gone onto win Grands Prix.

Formula Renault 2.0L timeline

Formula Renault 1.6L

This Formula Renault series was open to drivers between 14 and 21 years that have raced before in karting series.

The cars
The cars use K4M 1598cc Renault engines.

Championships

Winners

In Belgium 2007 championship, Karline Stala was the first ever woman to win a single seaters championship. She was invited to test the Formula Renault 3.5L at Circuit Paul Ricard in November 2007, like the best 2.0L and 3.5L drivers.

Formula Renault 1.6L timeline

Other formulas powered by Renault

Argentina organises several Formula Renault championships different from its official 2.0L series:
 Fórmula Renault Plus (since 2007) with Renault Clio K4M engine (1598cc).
 Fórmula Renault Interprovincial (since 2007) with 1.397 cc engine from Renault 12 T.S Break.
 Fórmula 4 Nacional (in 2007) with Renault K4M engine (1598cc) with lower power than the official 1.6L series. Teams can choose chassis manufacturer. Races are held during the TC 2000 weekends.
 Fórmula 4 Metropolitana (since 2008 season) with Renault K4M engine (1598cc) and replacing the Fórmula 4 Nacional series. Teams can choose chassis manufacturer.
 Fórmula Super Renault with Dallara, Reynard, Ralt or TOM'S chassis and Renault 21, 18 or F3R 2.0L engine. In 2005, the championship wasn't held due to the low of participation.

In 2008, the Formula 2000 Light was created. The series is held in Italy with Tatuus's Formula Renault or Formula Three chassis. The same year also saw the introduction of the LATAM Challenge Series, run in Latin America. The Austria Formel Renault Cup has been held since 2007 in Central Europe. This series is held and organised with the Austria Formula 3 Cup and use the 2.0L Renault formulas. The Formule Renault 2.0 North European Zone was also introduced in 2008.

2008 was the first, and ultimately last, season of the Formula Asia 2.0. Its aim was to bring more racing to the Asian region, allowing more drivers to opportunity to race and make the step up to the next level. The series used Renault engines with constructor Tatuus and ran on Michelin provided tyres.

Winners
For GP Series winners, see GP2 Series, GP2 Asia Series and GP3 Series pages.

See also
 List of Formula Renault cars

References

External links

  Renault Sport

Formula Renault 3.5L
  World Series by Renault
  Eurocup Formula Renault V6 former-series
  Formula V6 Asia

Formula Renault 2.0L
Europe
  Eurocup Formula Renault 2.0 renault-sport.com
  French Formula Renault 2.0  renault-sport.com
  Formula Renault 2.0 UK renaultsport.co.uk
  BARC Formula Renault BARC barc.net
  BARC Formula Renault renault-sport.uk
  Formula Renault 2.0 Italy renaultsportitalia.it
  Formula Renault 2.0 WEC formularenaultwec.com
  Formula Renault 2.0 NEC necup.com
  Formula Renault 2.0 NEC renault-sport.de
  Formula Renault 2.0 Switzerland worldseriesbyrenault.ch
  Formula Renault 2.0 Finland rata-sm.fi
  Fórmula Júnior FR2.0 Portugal formulajunior.net
America
  Formula TR Pro Series formulatr.com (USA)
  Formula Renault 2000 de America PanamGPSeries.com (Latin America)
  Mexican Formula Renault Championship copacorona.com (former series).
 Asia
  Asian Formula Renault Challenge frdsports.com
  Chinese Formula Renault frdsports.com

Formula Renault 1.6L
Europe
  Formul'Academy  autosportacademy.com
  Formula 1.6 Belgium renault-sport.be
  Formula 1.6 NEC Junior frcup.com
America
  Formula Renault 1.6 Argentina formulas-argentinas.com.ar
  APEFA apefa.com.ar
  Formula TR Pro Series formulatr.com (USA)
  Formula Junior 1600 PanamGPSeries.com (Latin America)

Other formulas powered by Renault
Europe
 (Austrian) Austria Formel Renault Cup f3.motion-company.eu (2.0L)
  Formula 2000 Light formula2000light.com (2.0L, Italy)
America
  Formula Super Renault Argentina campfsr.com.ar (2.0L)
  Formula Renault Interprovencial and Plus frinterprovincial.com (1.6L, Argentina)
Asia
  GP2 Asia Series gp2series.com (4L V8)
  Formula Asia 2.0 formulaasia2.com (2.0L)

 
Renault